Kash P. Heed (Kashmir Singh Heed) (born November 1955) is a former Canadian politician, who was elected as a BC Liberal Member of the Legislative Assembly of British Columbia in the 2009 provincial election, representing the riding of Vancouver-Fraserview.

He formerly served as the Minister of Public Safety and Solicitor General. He was formerly chief constable of the West Vancouver Police Department and a former superintendent with the Vancouver Police Department and was the first Indo-Canadian police chief in Canada.

Policing 
Heed graduated from the B.C. Police Academy in 1979 and began his career as an officer with the VPD.  In June 2007 he lost out to Deputy Chief Jim Chu for the position of Chief Constable of the VPD, but days later was appointed to that title in West Vancouver. He led the West Vancouver Police Department for 19 months and resigned on February 23, 2009.

He was the superintendent in charge of the south part of Vancouver, and as an Inspector was commander of District 3, which corresponds to the southeast quadrant of Vancouver.

Other roles in his career with the VPD have included heading the drug squad and Indo-Canadian gang task force, as well as implementing the department's COMPSTAT information technology system.

He is a published author who also teaches criminology and criminal justice at two B.C. colleges. He pioneered initiatives aimed at crime reduction and prevention as well as greater community and police engagement. He led the Indo-Canadian Task Force and inspired the formation of grassroots organizations dedicated to preventing gang violence.

Politics
Heed was appointed to the B.C. cabinet as Minister of Public Safety and Solicitor General on June 10, 2009. His responsibilities under this portfolio included crime prevention, law enforcement, victim services, road safety and emergency preparedness.

Heed's opponent and main electoral rival in the British Columbia New Democratic Party, Gabriel Yiu accused him of using images showing Heed in a police uniform in his campaign materials as being improper.

On April 9, 2010, Heed resigned in response to an unspecified RCMP investigation involving violations of the Elections Act. Heed was the third consecutive solicitor-general to step down in a 25-month period. Fund-raising irregularities subsequently came to light but the Special Prosecutor exonerated Heed of involvement and he came back into cabinet on May 4, 2010. Then, less than 24 hours later, the Special Prosecutor himself resigned when it was discovered that the law firm he came from had made financial contributions to the election campaign of Heed's party, the Liberals. Heed, once again, stepped down pending a more detailed probe into the case.

Radio broadcasting 
In 2016, Heed started as the morning talk-show host for 107.7 Pulse FM, a new English-language radio station based in Surrey, British Columbia. Heed has been very critical of the handling of the escape of Robbie Alkhalil, saying on 26 July 2022:  "I have never in my 32 years in policing, and my time since policing, seen such an inept investigation on a suspected murderer that has escaped from one of our secure institutions. I visited that institution, you just have to look at the incredible surveillance system that they have there, the quality of that system, and how could you not have images of individuals that assisted in that escape not available to the public. But you have photos taken off the internet, that are not even them, that you publish as accomplices to the escape? For you to get into the facility or anywhere near where some of the prisoners would be, especially some of these high risk prisoners, you will have gone through several surveillance systems or you ought to have gone through several surveillance systems, which would have captured your image. Alkhalil obviously had a well-planned escape plan, and who knows where he is right now, whether he is sitting low and waiting for things to calm down, or he's already made his way to another country. Will we ever know? I'm not sure. But do we have confidence that the investigation will lead us or give us the answers? No, I don't have the confidence in it."

See also
 Indo-Canadians in Greater Vancouver

References

Legislative Assembly of British Columbia (retrieved February 19, 2013)
Heed heads west, makes history by Mike Howell, Vancouver Courier, Friday, July 13, 2007 (retrieved July 22, 2007)
West Vancouver's new police chief 'an innovator' CBC.ca News, Wednesday, June 27, 2007 (retrieved June 1, 2018)
West Van top cop Heed resigns North Shore Outlook, February 23, 2009 (retrieved February 23, 2009)
B.C. Solicitor-General Kash Heed stepping down The Vancouver Sun April 9, 2010 (retrieved April 9, 2010)
B.C. Solicitor General Kash Heed resigns, Globe & Mail, August 23, 2012 (retrieved Feb 19, 2013)

External links
Kash Heed, MLA for Vancouver-Fraserview

Canadian police chiefs
Politicians from Vancouver
Richmond, British Columbia city councillors
Living people
British Columbia Liberal Party MLAs
Members of the Executive Council of British Columbia
1955 births
21st-century Canadian politicians
Canadian politicians of Indian descent
Solicitors general of Canadian provinces